Chroococcus is a genus of cyanobacteria belonging to the family Chroococcaceae.

The genus has cosmopolitan distribution.

Species:

Chroococcus batavus 
Chroococcus cimneticus 
Chroococcus cohaerens 
Chroococcus yellowstonensis
Chroococcus minor
Chroococcus hansgirgi

References

Chroococcales
Cyanobacteria genera